The 2022–23 Turkish Airlines EuroLeague is the 23rd season of the modern era of the EuroLeague, and the 13th under the title sponsorship of Turkish Airlines. Including the competition's previous incarnation as the FIBA Europe Champions Cup, this is the 66th season of the premier basketball competition for European men's clubs. CSKA Moscow had their license for the EuroLeague rescinded for the 2022–23 season following the Russian invasion of Ukraine.

Team allocation

Distribution
The following is the access list for this season.

Qualified teams
The labels in the parentheses show how each team qualified for the place of its starting round:

Notes

Teams

Venues and locations

Managerial changes

Referees
A total of 70 Euroleague Basketball officials are set to work on the 2022–23 season in EuroLeague and EuroCup:

Regular season

League table

Regulations
When more than two teams are tied, the ranking is established taking into account the victories obtained in the games played only among them. Should the tie persist among some, but not all, of the teams, the ranking of the teams still tied is determined by again taking into account the victories in the games played only among them, and repeating this same procedure until the tie is entirely resolved.
If a tie persists, the ranking is determined by the goal difference in favour and against in the games played only among the teams still tied.

Results

Awards
All official awards of the 2022–23 EuroLeague.

MVP of the Round

 
Regular season

MVP of the Month

Attendances

See also
2022–23 EuroCup Basketball
2022–23 Basketball Champions League
2022–23 FIBA Europe Cup

References

External links
 

 
EuroLeague seasons

Current basketball seasons